The Castle Road is a theme route in southern Germany (in Bavaria and Baden-Württemberg) and a small portion in the Czech Republic, between Mannheim and Prague.

It was established in 1954. In 1994 it was possible to extend it to Prague. 
It leads through the Neckar valley, the Hohenlohe Plateau, the Franconian Heights, Franconian Switzerland, the Fichtelgebirge and the Kaiserwald (Slavkovský les).

List of Places

The Castle Road at the moment passes, from west to east, the following places and landmarks.

 D-Mannheim – Mannheim Palace
 D-Schwetzingen – Schwetzingen Castle
 D-Heidelberg – Heidelberg Castle, Old Inner City
 D-Neckargemünd – Bergfeste Dilsberg
 D-Neckarsteinach – Schadeck Castle, Hinterburg Castle, Mittelburg and Vorderburg
 D-Hirschhorn (Neckar) – Hirschhorn Castle
 D-Eberbach – Eberbach Castle
 D-Zwingenberg - Zwingenburg
 D-Neckargerach - Minneburg
 D-Binau - Dauchstein Castle
 D-Obrigheim – Neuburg Castle
 D-Mosbach – historical town centre
 D-Neckarzimmern – Hornberg Castle
 D-Haßmersheim-Neckarmühlbach – Guttenberg Castle
 D-Gundelsheim – Horneck Castle
 D-Bad Rappenau – Heinsheim Castle, Ehrenberg Castle, Rappenau Water Castle 
 D-Bad Wimpfen – Kaiserpfalz Wimpfen
 D-Heilbronn – city itself
 D-Weinsberg – Weibertreu ruins
 D-Jagsthausen – Götzenburg (castle of Götz von Berlichingen)
 D-Öhringen – Öhringen Castle
 D-Neuenstein – Neuenstein Castle
 D-Waldenburg – Waldenburg Castle
 D-Schwäbisch Hall – Comburg
 D-Kirchberg an der Jagst – Kirchberg Castle
 D-Langenburg – Langenburg Castle
 D-Rothenburg ob der Tauber – Rothenburg ob der Tauber, medieval town
 D-Ansbach – Margravial Residence, Orangery and Hofgarten
 D-Romantic Franconia – Colmberg Castle, Veste Lichtenau, castle of the Teutonic Knights, Wolframs-Eschenbach
 D-Abenberg – Abenberg Castle
 D-Roth – Ratibor Castle
 D-Nürnberg – Nuremberg Castle
 D-Franconian Switzerland – Kaiserpfalz Forchheim, Ebermannstadt, Mark Wiesenttal, Egloffstein Castle, Gößweinstein Castle, Waischenfeld Castle, Aufsess Castle, Schloss Greifenstein
 D-Ahorntal - Rabenstein Castle
 D-Bamberg – Altenburg Castle, Bamberg, New Residence
 D-Rentweinsdorf - Schloss Rentweinsdorf
 D-Ebern - historic old town, Schloss Eyrichsdorf, Rotenhan Castle ruins
 D-Pfarrweisach - Lichtenstein Castle
 D-Maroldsweisach - Altenstein Castle
 D-Heldburg - Heldburg Fortress
 D-Coburg – Ehrenburg Palace, Veste Coburg, Callenberg Castle
 D-Lichtenfels – Lichtenfels Castle
 D-Kronach – Rosenberg Fortress
 D-Kulmbach – Plassenburg
 D-Bayreuth – New Palace Old Palace, Eremitage
 CZ-Cheb – Eger Castle
 CZ-Lázně Kynžvart – Königswart Castle (Lazne Kynzvart)
 CZ-Loket – Elbogen Castle (Hrad Loket)
 CZ-Bečov nad Teplou – Petschau Castle (Hrad a zámek Bečov)
 CZ-Teplá – Teplá Abbey
 CZ-Švihov – Svihov Castle (Vodní hrad Švihov)
 CZ-Nezvěstice – Nebilovy Castle (Zámek Nebílovy)
 CZ-Šťáhlavy – Kozel Castle (Zámek Kozel)
 CZ-Hořovice – Hořovice Castle
 CZ-Zdice – Žebrák Castle (Hrad Žebrák), Točník Castle (Hrad Točník)
 CZ-Křivoklát – Křivoklát Castle (Hrad Křivoklát)
 CZ-Karlštejn – Karlštejn Castle
 CZ-Prague – Prague Castle

Cycleway 

There also exits a Cycleway "Burgenstraßen-Radweg".

Gallery

Literature
 Arbeitsgemeinschaft "Die Burgenstraße": Burgenstraßen-Radwanderführer. Hrsg. Arbeitsgemeinschaft "Die Burgenstraße", Heilbronn. J. Fink-Kümmerly + Frey Verlag GmbH, Ostfildern
 Hans Konrad Schenk: Hohenlohe vom Reichsfürstentum zur Standesherrschaft. Swiridoff-Verlag Künzelsau, 2006.

External links
Official site in English
Castle Road from Mannheim to Waldenburg
 http://www.burgen.strasse-online.de

Tourist attractions in Bavaria
German tourist routes
Tourist attractions in Baden-Württemberg
Tourist attractions in the Czech Republic